Batraki (Batrak) is a rural locality (a village) in Imay-Karmalinsky Selsoviet, Davlekanovsky District, Bashkortostan, Russia. The population was 88 as of 2010. There is 1 street.

Geography 
Batraki is located 34 km northeast of Davlekanovo (the district's administrative centre) by road. Karatal is the nearest rural locality.

References 

Rural localities in Davlekanovsky District